Alexandra Taylor (born May 4, 1994) is an alpine skier from Cyprus. She was scheduled to compete for Cyprus at the 2014 Winter Olympics in the slalom competition, however withdrew  from the competition, because she fractured the first lumbar vertebra on the 18th of February, four days before the race.

See also
Cyprus at the 2014 Winter Olympics
Alpine skiing at the 2014 Winter Olympics

References

1994 births
Living people
Olympic alpine skiers of Cyprus
Alpine skiers at the 2014 Winter Olympics
Cypriot female alpine skiers